Avaz Mohammad Beyk (also Romanized as ʿAvaẕ Moḩammad Beyk; also known as ʿAvaẕ Moḩammad Beyg) is a village in Dorungar Rural District, Now Khandan District, Dargaz County, Razavi Khorasan Province, Iran. At the 2006 census, its population was 102 in 25 families.

See also 

 List of cities, towns and villages in Razavi Khorasan Province

References 

Populated places in Dargaz County